Ma Wenge (Chinese: 马文革; born March 27, 1968) is a table tennis player from China. He won a bronze medal in 1992 Barcelona Olympics Games in men's single, as well as men's team champion of 1995 and 1997 world table tennis championship (together with Wang Tao, Ding Song, Kong Linghui and Liu Guoliang).
He won the Men's singles in the Table Tennis World Cup in 1989 and 1992 and was a silver medalist in 1990.

References

1968 births
Chinese male table tennis players
Olympic bronze medalists for China
Living people
Olympic medalists in table tennis
Asian Games medalists in table tennis
Table tennis players from Tianjin
Table tennis players at the 1990 Asian Games
Table tennis players at the 1994 Asian Games
Olympic table tennis players of China
Asian Games gold medalists for China
Asian Games bronze medalists for China
Medalists at the 1990 Asian Games
Medalists at the 1994 Asian Games
Medalists at the 1992 Summer Olympics
Table tennis players at the 1992 Summer Olympics